Heirs is the fourth studio album by And So I Watch You From Afar. Released on May 4, 2015, the album was made available to stream through the online music publication The Fader a week before its release, which revealed the track listing of the album.

Track listing

Personnel
Rory Friers – guitar, vocals
Niall Kennedy – guitar, vocals
Jonathan Adger – bass guitar, vocals
Chris Wee – drums, percussion, vocals
Rock O'Reilly – production, mixing, engineering
Niall Doran – engineering
Robin Schmidt – mastering
Sonny Kay – art and layout

References

2015 albums
And So I Watch You from Afar albums